The 2021–22 Canberra Capitals season is the 38th season for the franchise in the Women's National Basketball League (WNBL).

Roster

Standings

Results

Regular season

Finals

Semi-finals

Notes
 Canberra's Round 11 game against the Southside Flyers was a win by forfeit.

References

External links
Canberra Capitals Official website

2021–22 WNBL season
WNBL seasons by team
Basketball,Canberra Capitals
2021 in basketball
2021 in women's basketball
2021–22 in Australian basketball